Sajin Cherukayil is an Indian actor and script writer who has worked predominantly in Malayalam movie industry. Sajin has worked in popular movies like Super Sharanya, Thinkalazhcha Nishchayam, Allu Ramendran, Thanneermathan Dinangal. Sajin's previous film to hit the theatres was Super Sharanya in the year 2022.

Filmography

Short films

References 

Year of birth missing (living people)
Living people
Indian actors